Davide Agazzi (born 2 June 1993) is an Italian footballer who plays as a midfielder for Ternana.

Club career
On 13 July 2018, he joined Serie B club Livorno on a season-long loan.

On 8 July 2019 he joined Livorno permanently earning £9,000 per week.

On 16 January 2021, he returned to Serie B (Livorno was relegated at the end of the 2019–20 season) and signed with Vicenza.

On 5 July 2021, he signed a two-year contract with Ternana.

References

External links

Eurosport Profile

Living people
1993 births
Sportspeople from the Province of Bergamo
Association football midfielders
Italian footballers
Savona F.B.C. players
S.S. Virtus Lanciano 1924 players
Catania S.S.D. players
Calcio Foggia 1920 players
U.S. Livorno 1915 players
L.R. Vicenza players
Ternana Calcio players
Serie B players
Serie C players
People from Trescore Balneario
Footballers from Lombardy